Stever Ridge is an irregular ridge stretching southeast from Mount Riddolls to the confluence of Behr Glacier and Borchgrevink Glacier in the Victory Mountains of Victoria Land. Named by Advisory Committee on Antarctic Names (US-ACAN) for H. Guyford Stever, Director of the National Science Foundation, 1972–74, which has overall administrative responsibility for the U.S. Antarctic Research Program. He traveled and worked in Antarctica on two occasions, 1973 and 1975.

Ridges of Victoria Land
Borchgrevink Coast